The 2021–22 Coupe de France preliminary rounds, Pays de la Loire was the qualifying competition to decide which teams from the leagues of the Pays de la Loire region of France took part in the main competition from the seventh round.

A total of eleven teams qualified from the Pays de la Loire preliminary rounds. In 2020–21, Voltigeurs de Châteaubriant and Olympique Saumur FC progressed furthest in the main competition, reaching the round of 16 before losing to Montpellier and Toulouse respectively.

Draws and fixtures
On 7 July 2021, the league announce that 532 teams had entered from the region.

On 21 July 2021, the league published the first round draw along with further details of the structure of the competition. 482 teams entered at the first round stage, from district divisions, Régional 3 and Régional 2. The remaining nine teams from Régional 2 entered at the second round stage. 22 clubs from Régional 1 and 12 from Championnat National 3 entered at the third round stage, along with the qualifier from Saint Pierre and Miguelon. The two clubs from Championnat National 2 entered at the fourth round stage and the three clubs from Championnat National entered at the fifth round stage. The second round draw was published on 1 September 2021. The fifth round draw was published on 6 October 2021. The sixth round draw was published on 19 October 2021.

First round
These matches were played on 29 August 2021.

Second round
These matches were played on 5 September 2021.

Third round
These matches were played on 17, 18 and 19 September 2021.

Fourth round
These matches were played on 2 and 3 October 2021.

Fifth round
These matches were played on 16 and 17 October 2021.

Sixth round
These matches were played on 30 and 31 October 2021.

References

preliminary rounds